Pizzo Pesciora (or Poncione di Pesciora) is a mountain in the Lepontine Alps, located on the border between the Swiss cantons of Valais and Ticino. It lies north of Bedretto, on the ridge between the Witenwasserenstock and Pizzo Rotondo.

References

External links
Pizzo Pesciora on Summitpost
Pizzo Pesciora on Hikr

Mountains of the Alps
Alpine three-thousanders
Mountains of Switzerland
Mountains of Ticino
Lepontine Alps